Saulsbury may refer to:
Saulsbury, Tennessee
Saulsbury, West Virginia

People with the name Saulsbury

Eli M. Saulsbury
Gove Saulsbury
Willard Saulsbury Jr.
Willard Saulsbury Sr.

See also
Saulsburg, Pennsylvania